Sir Stephen John Limrick Bubb JP FRSA (born 5 November 1952) is Director of Charity Futures, and the Acting Director of the Oxford Institute of Charity.  He was Chief Executive of the UK charity leaders representative body Association of Chief Executives of Voluntary Organisations (ACEVO) from 2000 to 2016. He received a knighthood in 2011 for his services to the voluntary sector. From March 2011 to June 2011, Bubb was seconded to the Department of Health, as part of the team leading Andrew Lansley's National Health Service (NHS) "listening exercise".

Bubb is regarded as influential within the Labour and Conservative Parties, with his longstanding advocacy of charities replacing public services chiming with both parties' policy of promoting competition and choice in areas such as health care. He has described criticisms of competition as belonging in the "last century".

Background
Bubb was born in Gillingham, Kent.  He read Philosophy, Politics and Economics at Christ Church, Oxford.

Career
After briefly being a civil servant, Bubb became a Research Officer for the TGWU's Jack Jones in 1976. In 1980, he became Negotiations Officer for the National Union of Teachers, before, in 1987, becoming a lead adviser to the Association of Metropolitan Authorities in its pay negotiations. 

In 1995, he became the first Director of Personnel of the National Lottery Charities Board. He became the CEO of the Association of Chief Executives of Voluntary Organisations in 2000.

Bubb was Chairman of the Adventure Capital Fund, which became the Social Investment Board from 2006 to 2016; and Chairman of Futurebuilders England in 2008.

After stepping down from ACEVO, Bubb founded Charity Futures to investigate challenges to, and provide support for, the third sector for the next generation.

In 2018, Bubb was appointed the Acting Director of the Oxford Institute of Charity, which is being hosted by New College, Oxford. Once funding has been achieved, it will research and study charity, as well as promoting the sustainability of the UK's charity sector. It will be the first such research centre for charities in the world.

Other activities
Bubb was a Labour Party member of Lambeth Borough Council for Clapham Town ward from 1982, serving as chief whip for the Labour group. When the Labour group protested against rate-capping by refusing to set a rate, Bubb was among 32 Lambeth councillors who were surcharged for causing the council a financial loss by willful misconduct. This action disqualified him from being a councillor for five years from the end of March 1986.

He spent nearly 20 years as a Youth Court Magistrate in inner London (1980-2000). He also acted on local health boards in South London (Guy's Hospital and St Thomas' Hospital) and set up an HIV centre there.

In 2014, he was asked by the UK Government to review the progress that had been made in implementing promises made to close institutions for people with learning disabilities following the Winterboune View abuse scandal that was exposed by Panorama.

His recommendations were accepted by Government but a further abuse scandal in 2019 led to Bubb denouncing the failure of government and calling for new legislation and an independent commissioner for people with learning disabilities.

Bubb is also a trustee of Helen and Douglas House.

Controversy
Stephen Bubb came under scrutiny in August 2013 after it was reported that his 60th birthday bash in the House of Commons had been partly financed by his own charity, ACEVO. Despite the charity paying him a salary in excess of £100,000, he still felt it was fine for the charity to cover some of the costs and stated "seemed just right to celebrate my 60th with a tea party in the House of Lords on Monday!"

References

External links
 Blogsite

1952 births
Living people
People from Gillingham, Kent
Alumni of Christ Church, Oxford
Councillors in the London Borough of Lambeth
Knights Bachelor
English justices of the peace